Thomas Stickroth (born 13 April 1965) is a German football manager and former player.

Playing career
Beginning as a youth player at VfB Stuttgart, Stickroth spent nearly his entire career in Germany, playing with SC Freiburg, FC Homburg, Bayer Uerdingen, 1. FC Saarbrücken and VfL Bochum. His only spell outside of Germany came between 1990 and 1992, when he played for Scottish side St Mirren.

Coaching career
From the beginning of 2009, he became assistant coach for his friend Uwe Fuchs at 3. Liga side Wuppertaler SV Borussia and was on 2 April 2010 named as caretaker by Wuppertaler SV.

Stickroth was appointed as assistant coach for Roland Vrabec at FC Vaduz in the summer of 2017. After head coach Roland Vrabec got fired on 5 September 2017, Stickroth took over as a caretaker manager. It lasted until 17 September, when Mario Frick was appointed as the new head coach. 

On 4 December 2018, Stickroth became the assistant coach of Jens Keller at FC Ingolstadt 04.

References

External links
 
 

1965 births
Living people
German footballers
VfB Stuttgart players
SC Freiburg players
FC 08 Homburg players
KFC Uerdingen 05 players
St Mirren F.C. players
1. FC Saarbrücken players
VfL Bochum players
Bundesliga players
Footballers from Stuttgart
Scottish Football League players
Association football defenders
Association football wingers
German football managers
Wuppertaler SV non-playing staff
Wuppertaler SV managers
FC St. Pauli non-playing staff
SC Westfalia Herne non-playing staff
FSV Frankfurt non-playing staff
FC Vaduz non-playing staff
FC Vaduz managers
FC Ingolstadt 04 non-playing staff
German expatriate footballers
German expatriate football managers
German expatriate sportspeople in Scotland
Expatriate footballers in Scotland
German expatriate sportspeople in Liechtenstein
Expatriate football managers in Liechtenstein